Gangbyeon Station is a station on the Seoul Subway Line 2. The name of this station literally means "riverside," pertaining to its proximity to the Han River.

Station layout

Neighborhoods
Techno Mart, shopping mall with movie theater and office building.
East Seoul Intercity Bus Terminal

References

Seoul Metropolitan Subway stations
Metro stations in Gwangjin District
Railway stations opened in 1980
1980 establishments in South Korea
20th-century architecture in South Korea